Love and Betrayal: The Mia Farrow Story is a 1995 American drama miniseries directed by Karen Arthur and written by Cynthia A. Cherbak. The film stars Patsy Kensit, Dennis Boutsikaris, Richard Muenz, Robert LuPone, Gina Wilkinson and Frances Helm. The film aired on Fox in two parts on February 28, 1995, and on March 2, 1995.

Plot

Cast 

Patsy Kensit as Mia Farrow
Dennis Boutsikaris as Woody Allen
Richard Muenz as Frank Sinatra
Robert LuPone as André Previn
Gina Wilkinson as Vicky
Frances Helm as Maureen O'Sullivan
Taryn Davis as Dylan #3 
Grace Una as Soon-Yi Previn
Bruce McCarty as Roman Polanski
Nigel Bennett as John Farrow
Lynne Cormack as Dory Previn
Heidi von Palleske as Young Maureen O'Sullivan
Michael Tait as Judge Wilk
Natalie Miller as Young Mia Farrow
Kristi Groteke as herself
Christine Andreas as Ava Gardner
Pamela Sinha as Krish
Caley Wilson as Michael Farrow
Tina Su as Soon-Yi #2
Alan Rose as Joey D
Donna Coney Island as Liza
Susan Potvin as Rachel
Natalie Gray as Andre's Mistress
Jay Bajaj as Maharishi
Damon Redfern as Robert Redford
Laura Catalano as Starlett 
Chandra West as Mariel Hemingway
Mia Kim Steinberg as Daisy #2 
Hayden Christensen as Fletcher
Daniel Lee as Moses #2
Jordon Sim as Fletcher #1
Fiona Meng Yen To as Lark #1 
Roseanne Li as Daisy #1
Micah Uemura as Moses #1
Shoral Jamieson as Dylan #2
Robin Dunne as Fletcher #3
Quyen Hua as Lark #3
Kim Johnson as Daisy #3
Joshua Hagley as Moses #3
Max Naiman as Satchel #3 
Lianna Yeung as Tam Farrow 
Katlin Yeung as Soon-Yi #1

References

External links
 

1995 television films
1995 films
1990s American television miniseries
1995 drama films
Fox network original films
Films directed by Karen Arthur
Films scored by David Michael Frank
American drama television films
1990s English-language films
1990s American films